NGC 4316 is an edge-on spiral galaxy located about 70 million light-years away in the constellation Virgo. It was discovered by astronomer Wilhelm Tempel on March 17, 1882. NGC 4316 is a member of the Virgo Cluster and is classified as LINER and as a Seyfert galaxy.

The galaxy has undergone ram-pressure stripping in the past.

On February 28, 2003 a type II supernova known as SN 2003bk was discovered in NGC 4316.

References

External links

Spiral galaxies
LINER galaxies
Seyfert galaxies
Virgo Cluster

Virgo (constellation)
4316
040119
Astronomical objects discovered in 1882
07447